At the 1952 Summer Olympics, seven fencing events were contested, six for men and one for women.

Medal summary

Men's events

Women's events

Medal table

Participating nations
A total of 286 fencers (249 men and 37 women) from 32 nations competed at the Helsinki Games:

References

 
1952 Summer Olympics events
1952
1952 in fencing
Fencing competitions in Finland